The 2011 IMSA Prototype Lites season is the sixth season of the International Motor Sports Association's Prototype Lites championship.  The season consisted of fourteen rounds at seven race meetings, beginning at Sebring International Raceway on March 17, and concluding at Road Atlanta on September 30.  Ricardo Vera won the championship in the L1 class, and Robert Sabato won the L2 class championship.

Schedule and results
All races supported the 2011 American Le Mans Series season. All rounds consisted of 30 minute races.

Championship standings
Points are awarded to the top 15 finishers in each class.

Lites 1

Lites 2

References

External links
Season results

IMSA Prototype Challenge
Imsa Prototype Lites